The Fairfax Bridge (formerly known as the O'Farrell Bridge) is a steel-lattice three-hinged arch bridge spanning the Carbon River on State Route 165 in Pierce County, Washington. Previous to the construction of the bridge in 1921, the only route south to the area around Fairfax was by train. Being a single-lane bridge, vehicles must yield to oncoming traffic already on the bridge.

The bridge was added to the National Register of Historic Places in 1982.

In 1921, a riveted steel arch was built jointly by the county and state across the Carbon River providing the link which enabled the construction of the first road to Fairfax. Previously a train, which passed through Fairfax only twice a day, was the town's primary route to the outside world. The only alternative to the train was walking to Melmont, where there was a wagon road to other towns. The construction of the steel arch, which was purported to be the highest span in the state at the time of its construction, was a vital transportation link to this remote town.

The  bridge has a  three-hinged braced rib steel arch, two  steel towers, and 16 timber trestle approach spans. The chords of the ribs are composed of channels. They are braced with two angles that are latticed in a Warren truss configuration. The vertical members of the towers and spandrel columns are made up of two latticed channels. The  roadway rests on a Warren stiffening truss. The Minneapolis Steel and Machinery Company provided the steel for the project. The arches sit on concrete footings. The approaches and the deck were reconstructed in 1945.

The Fairfax Bridge is one of two three-hinged lattice arches remaining within the state. In his book Bridge Engineering, John Alexander Low Waddell explains the reason for the paucity of arches in the United States. "Arches are employed very generally in Europe on account of their superior appearance as compared with simple-truss bridges, and because of the powerful influence of the old masonry arch upon the minds of European bridge designers, regardless of the consideration of economy. American engineers, on the other hand, have been indifferent to the question of aesthetics, and have preferred simple spans to arches mainly for reasons of simplicity and economy, but sometimes on account of their greater rigidity. Another reason why the arch has not been used much in American practice is that the conditions, which make it economical, are not met with as frequently in this country as in Europe. For deep gorges with rocky sides, or for shallow streams with rock bottom and natural abutments, arches are eminently proper and economical." The conditions that made the bridge type economical in Europe were mirrored in the deep canyon of the Carbon River.

See also

List of bridges documented by the Historic American Engineering Record in Washington (state)
List of bridges in the United States by height
List of bridges on the National Register of Historic Places in Washington (state)

References

Sources

External links

Bridges completed in 1921
Bridges in Pierce County, Washington
Historic American Engineering Record in Washington (state)
National Register of Historic Places in Pierce County, Washington
Open-spandrel deck arch bridges in the United States
Road bridges on the National Register of Historic Places in Washington (state)
Steel bridges in the United States
Trestle bridges in the United States
Warren truss bridges in the United States